Oria is a genus of moths of the family Noctuidae.

Species
 Oria flavescens (Hampson, 1902)
 Oria musculosa (Hübner, [1808])
 Oria myodea (Rambur, 1858)

References
Natural History Museum Lepidoptera genus database
Oria at funet

Hadeninae